Laurent Lafitte (born 22 August 1973) is a French actor. He is known for playing the role of Patrick in Elle. In March 2016 he was named as the host of the opening and closing ceremonies at the 2016 Cannes Film Festival.

Filmography

Theater

References

External links

 

1973 births
Living people
21st-century French male actors
French male film actors
French male television actors
French male stage actors
French comedians
French theatre directors
People from Val-de-Marne
Troupe of the Comédie-Française
Cours Florent alumni
French National Academy of Dramatic Arts alumni
Chevaliers of the Ordre des Arts et des Lettres
20th-century French male actors